The Huanzo mountain range (possibly from in the Quechua spelling Wansu) lies in the Andes of Peru. It extends between 14°30 and 15°01'S and 72°10 and 73°15W for about 57 km. It is situated in the Apurímac Region, Antabamba Province, in the Arequipa Region, Castilla Province, La Unión Province, in the Ayacucho Region, Parinacochas Province, and in the Chumbivilcas Province of the Cusco Region.

Mountains 
Other mountains are listed below:

 Waytani, 
 Waqrawiri, 
 Waña, 
 Allqa Walusa, 
 Chankuwaña, 
 Yana Yana, 
 Wachu Willka, 
 Qullpa K'uchu, 
 Wamanripa, 
 Wayunka, 
 Willkarana, 
 Ikma, 
 Wiska Waqi, 
 Aqu Suntu, 
 Tintaya, 
 Lunq'u, 
 Kunturi, 
 Chawpi Chawpi, 
 Janq'u Q'awa, 
 Hatunqullpa, 
 Kuntur K'uchu, 
 Kunturi, 
 Minasniyuq, 
 Pichaqani, 
 Puka Suntu, 
 Salli, 
 Surimana, 
 Wiska Tunqu, 
 Sara Sara, 
 Kisu Qutu, 
 P'umpu Q'asa, 
 Huch'uy Sara Sara, 
 Llulluch'a, 
 Inti Utka, 
 Jalanta, 
 Millu, 
 Mina Q'asa, 
 Kunturillu, 
 Puka Puka, 
 Qullpa, 
 Sullu Sullu, 
 Wayta Urqu, 
 Wila Quta, 
 Yuraq Punta, 
 Aqu Q'asa, 
 Kimsa Chata, 
 Aqu Suntu, 
 Chhijmuni, 
 Urpi Marka, 
 Q'illu Urqu, 
 Hatun Sisiwa, 
 Yana Ranra, 
 Anka Phawa, 
 Anka Phawa (Puyca), 
 Anqasi, 
 Chaka Urqu, 
 Challwa Q'asa, 
 Chunta Pata, 
 Chuqllu Chuqllu, 
 Ch'uwañuma, 
 Ch'iyara Ch'iyara, 
 Hatun Pata, 
 Kimsa Qaqa, 
 Kinra, 
 Kunturi, 
 Khirki Urqu, 
 Khuchi Pata, 
 Llimphiq, 
 Lluqu Chuyma, 
 Muntirayuq, 
 Panti Pata, 
 Paychi (Anta.-Esp.), 
 Paychi (Anta.), 
 Pilluni, 
 Pirqa, 
 Pirqasqa, 
 Pisti Q'asa, 
 Pukara, 
 Puka Ranra, 
 Puka Ranra (Arequ.), 
 Qarwa K'uchu, 
 Qarwa Urqu, 
 Qillqa, 
 Qillqata, 
 Quncha Urqu, 
 Quri Pawkara, 
 Quri Waraqa, 
 Q'illu, 
 Q'illu Pachaka, 
 Rumi Urqu, 
 Runtu Quri, 
 Saxa Q'awa, 
 Sullu Marka, 
 Surimana, 
 Taypi Q'awa, 
 Thujsa, 
 T'alla Kallanka, 
 Uturunku, 
 Waman Ch'arpa, 
 Wank'ayuq Saywa, 
 Waqrawiri, 
 Wayrawiri, 
 Yana Urqu, 
 Yawriwiri, 
 Yuraq Apachita, 
 Yuraq Kancha, 
 Yuraq Rumi, 
 Puka Urqu, 
 Sisiwa, 
 Saywa Punta, 
 Allqa Q'awa, 
 Challwa Q'asa, 
 Chullumpi, 
 Hatun Q'asa, 
 Inka Urqu, 
 Kuntur Wasi, 
 Misa Urqu, 
 Pachak Pata, 
 Puka Urqu, 
 Puma Ranra, 
 Phiruru, 
 Q'illu Wachu, 
 Uqi Saywa, 
 Utkhu, 
 Yana Uqhu, 
 Yuraq Urqu, 
 Yuraq Wasina,

Lakes 
One of the largest lake in the range is Lake Ecma.

References

Mountain ranges of Peru
Mountain ranges of Cusco Region
Mountain ranges of Arequipa Region
 
 
Mountain ranges of Ayacucho Region 
Mountain ranges of Apurímac Region